The Rodeo Carburettor was a three-piece Japanese rock band that formed in 2001. The band hardly speaks on-stage (other than announcing the song name).

Their use of distortion and noise have often led to comparisons to Guitar Wolf.

In 2005 the band performed at UK's International Music Convention, In The City at Manchester, along with fellow Japanese artists PE'Z and DMBQ. This was followed with another show at London's The Marquee Club that featured Mika Bomb. In 2006, the band toured the United States as part of the Japan Nite event.

Their song "Speed of Flow" was used as an ending for the anime series Gintama. It reached No. 43 on the Oricon Singles Chart.

Discography 
Extended plays
  – November 10, 2004
 Pissed Off – March 24, 2005
 God of Hell – November 2, 2005
 Vandalize – August 5, 2009

Albums
 Black Luster Songs – April 19, 2006
 Kingdom – April 18, 2007
 Stripdown JunkYard Mixes – October 15, 2008
 Rowdydow – November 5, 2008

Singles
 "Meaningful / Precious EP" – December 6, 2006
 "Glare" – October 10, 2007
 "Speed of Flow" – February 14, 2008

Tours 
Pissed Off TOUR – April, 2005 -> July, 2005
God of Hell TOUR – November 23, 2005 -> December 19, 2005 –  10 cities, 11 locations.

See also
J-Rock

References

External links 
Kowalski Official Homepage
The Rodeo Carburettor Official Homepage

Japanese rock music groups